PROBA is minisatellite technology demonstration mission in ESA's General Study Program with the objective to address issues of on-board operational autonomy of a generic platform. 

PROBA (Project for On-Board Autonomy), renamed PROBA-1, is a Belgian satellite launched atop an Indian Polar Satellite Launch Vehicle by ISRO on 22 October 2001. The satellite was funded through the ESA's MicroSat program. This small (60×60×80 cm; 95 kg) boxlike system, with solar panel collectors on its surface, has remarkable image-making qualities. It hosts two Earth Observation instruments dubbed CHRIS and HRC. CHRIS is a hyperspectral system (200 narrow bands) that images at 17 m resolution, while HRC is a monochromatic camera that images visible light at 5 m resolution.

With an initial lifetime of one to two years, the satellite celebrated its 20th year of operations in 2021. On 9 March 2018, it surpassed ERS-2 as ESA's longest operated Earth observation mission of all time.

Series of satellites 
PROBA is also the name of the series of satellites starting with PROBA-1. The name is also used to refer to the bus of the satellites.

The second satellite in the PROBA series, PROBA-2, was launched on 2 November 2009 together with the SMOS satellite.

The third satellite to be launched was PROBA-V (PROBA-Vegetation), on 7 May 2013.

Further planned satellites in the PROBA series include the formation flying demonstration mission PROBA-3 and limb sounder ALTIUS.

See also 

Miniaturized satellite

References

External links
 http://earth.esa.int/proba/ 
 PROBA-1 article on eoPortal by ESA
 PROBA-2 article on eoPortal by ESA
 PROBA-3 article on eoPortal by ESA
 PROBA-V article on eoPortal by ESA
 PROBA-V plus one article on eoPortal by ESA

Earth observation satellites of the European Space Agency
European Space Agency
Spacecraft launched in 2001
Spacecraft launched by PSLV rockets
Technology demonstrations